Zonn may refer to:

Andrea Zonn (born 1969), American singer and fiddle player
Włodzimierz Zonn (1905–1975), Polish astronomer
Zonn., taxonomic author abbreviation of Ben Zonneveld

See also
Zohn
Zonn (disambiguation)